Sylviana Murni (born 11 October 1958) is an Indonesian politician and bureaucrat who has been a member of the Regional Representative Council since 2019. She has previously served as mayor of Central Jakarta between 2008 and 2010 and later participated as a running mate in the 2017 Jakarta gubernatorial election.

Early life
Sylviana was born in Jakarta on 11 October 1958. She studied law at Jayabaya University, and later economics at the University of Indonesia (masters) and Jakarta State University (doctorate). In 1981, during her final semester at Jayabaya, she participated in the Mr. & Miss Jakarta (Abang None Jakarta) contest as her friend had signed her up, and she won first place.

Career
She began working for Jakarta's provincial government in 1985. She was promoted multiple times, and by 1997 she was head of the culture and mental coaching in Jakarta's educational department. Shortly before the fall of Suharto, Sylviana also served in the Jakarta Regional People's Representative Council between 1997 and 1999. After the stint as a legislator, she returned to her bureaucratic work, being appointed head of the social development department until 2001, head of the population and civil registration office until 2004, and head of elementary education until 2008.

On 1 April 2008, she was appointed as the mayor of Central Jakarta. She became the first woman to serve as mayor of Jakarta's five administrative cities. Saefullah was appointed to replace her on 4 November 2010. She was later proposed as a potential candidate for regional secretary (the highest bureaucratic office in Jakarta) in 2014, but was passed over in favor of Saefullah, and Sylviana was instead appointed governor's deputy for tourism and culture. 

In order to run as Agus Harimurti Yudhoyono's running mate in the 2017 Jakarta gubernatorial election, she resigned from her civil servant job in September 2016. The pair was defeated in the first round of the election, and Sylviana instead ran as a Jakarta senatorial candidate for the 2019 legislative election. She was elected into the Regional Representative Council with 455,182 votes, ranking fourth in Jakarta out of an allotment of four senators.

References

Living people
1958 births
People from Jakarta
Betawi people
University of Indonesia alumni
Jakarta State University alumni
Indonesian civil servants
Women mayors of places in Indonesia
Democratic Party (Indonesia) politicians
Members of the Regional Representative Council
Jakarta Regional People's Representative Council members
Mayors and regents of places in Jakarta